Gary "Doc" Hermalyn is an American historian and author, based in New York City. He is an Edgar Allan Poe scholar, and an authority on the history of The Bronx. Hermalyn is editor/author of 172 books on urban history, geography, education, natural history and exploration. He is CEO of The Bronx County Historical Society and a fellow of The Explorers Club.

Biography

Hermalyn grew up in the Gun Hill-Norwood, Bronx neighborhood. He graduated from The Bronx High School of Science, earned a bachelor's degree from City College of New York, a Master of Arts from Long Island University (1982) and a Doctor of Education from Columbia University (1985).

He has been director, then executive director and is currently CEO of The Bronx County Historical Society. He founded and established the Society's The Bronx County Archives and The Bronx County Historical Society Research Library. He is also a Board Member of the Greater Bridgeport Symphony in Bridgeport, Connecticut and as of 2017 was Vice Chairman of the Board of Trustees of the Discovery Museum and Planetarium in Bridgeport.

Hermalyn is an explorer and a fellow of The Explorers Club.

Awards
Centennial Historian of New York City, Mayor of New York City, 1998

Publications

Books by Hermalyn
The Creation of Morris High School, 1896-1904: the First Public High School in The Bronx. Teachers College, Columbia University, 1985. . Dissertation.
Morris High School and the Creation of the New York City Public High School System. New York City Series. New York: The Bronx County Historical Society, 1995. .
Publications of the Bronx County Historical Society: 1955–2000. New York: The Bronx County Historical Society, 1999. 
The Study and Writing of History. New York: The Bronx County Historical Society, 2007. .

Books paired with others
The Bronx in the Innocent Years, 1890-1925. The Life in The Bronx Collection. New York: Harper & Row, 1985. Hermalyn and Lloyd Ultan. . Hermalyn was also project editor.
The Beautiful Bronx 1920-1950. The Life in The Bronx Collection. New York: Harmony, 1988. Hermalyn and Ultan. . Hermalyn was also project editor.
Landmarks of the Bronx. New York: Bronx County Historical Society, 1989. Hermalyn and Robert Kornfeld. .
The Bronx. It Was Only Yesterday. 1935-1965. The Life in The Bronx Collection. New York: The Bronx County Historical Society, 1992. Hermalyn and Ultan. . Hermalyn was also project editor.
The Bronx Cookbook Plastic Comb – 1997. New York: The Bronx County Historical Society, 1997. Hermalyn and Peter Derrick. .
The Birth of the Bronx: 1609 - 1900. The Life in The Bronx Collection Vol. 4. New York: The Bronx County Historical Society, 2000. Hermalyn and Ultan. . Hermalyn was also project editor.
Time and the Calendar. New York: History of New York City Project, 2001. Elizabeth Beirne and Hermalyn. .
Yankee Stadium: 1923-2008: Images of Baseball. Mount Pleasant, SC: Arcadia Publishing, 2009. Hermalyn and Anthony C. Greene. .
The Bronx. Then & Now. Mount Pleasant, SC: Arcadia Publishing, 2010. Kathleen A. McAuley and Hermalyn. .
A Historical Sketch of the Bronx. New York: The Bronx County Historical Society, 2018. Hermalyn and Ultan. .
Hudson's River. New York: The Bronx County Historical Society, 2020. Hermalyn and Sidney Horenstein. .

Books with editing contributions by Hermalyn (selected)
The Encyclopedia of New York City. Hermalyn was a member of the editorial board / associate editor.
The United States Supreme Court. Ten volume series. Hermalyn was a project editor.
Roots of The Republic Six. Six volume series. Hermalyn was a project editor.
Research Library and Bronx Archives. Fifteen volume series. The Bronx County Historical Society. Hermalyn was a project editor.

References

External links
Dr.Gary Hermalyn-The History of Writing Pt. 1 – YouTube video

Fellows of the Explorers Club
Writers from the Bronx
21st-century American historians
21st-century American male writers
Historians of New York City
Historians from New York (state)
Living people
Year of birth missing (living people)
American male non-fiction writers